
Tralee and Dingle Light Railway 4 was a  was a  narrow gauge locomotive built by Hunslet Engine Company in 1890.  It operated the Tralee and Dingle Light Railway's  Castle-Gregory branch in County Kerry, Ireland, until withdrawn in 1907.

The locomotive had cabs at both ends and the controls were duplicated so there was no need to turn the locomotive round at each end of the route.

The Fry Collection includes a model of the locomotive.  The picture of the Fry model shows a locomotive to apparently have a raised covered cab at both ends linked by the boiler with side tanks with the chimney extending though the somewhat longer cab at the front end.

Following withdrawal the number 4 was taken in 1908 by  No. 8 built in 1903, the number 8 then being taken a locomotive built in 1910.

Notes and references

Notes

References

Sources
 
 
 

0-4-2T locomotives
Steam locomotives of Ireland
Hunslet narrow gauge locomotives
Railway locomotives introduced in 1890
3 ft gauge locomotives
Scrapped locomotives